The legislative districts of Quezon City are the representations of the highly urbanized city of Quezon in the various national and local legislatures of the Philippines. At present, the province is represented in the House of Representatives of the Philippines by its six congressional districts, with the districts' representatives being elected every three years. Additionally, each district is allotted six seats in the Quezon City Council, creating a total of thirty-six elective seats in the legislature.

History 
From its creation in 1939 to 1972, Quezon City was represented as part of Rizal Province, with the western areas that formerly belonged to Caloocan, Mandaluyong, and San Juan voting as part of that province's first district, and the eastern areas that formerly belonged to Marikina, Montalban (now Rodriguez), Pasig, and San Mateo voting in the second district.

In the disruption caused by the Second World War, Quezon City was incorporated into the City of Greater Manila on January 1, 1942, by virtue of Manuel Quezon's Executive Order No. 400 as a wartime emergency measure. Greater Manila was represented by two delegates in the National Assembly of the Japanese-sponsored Second Philippine Republic: one was the city mayor (an ex officio member), while the other was elected through a citywide assembly of KALIBAPI members during the Japanese occupation of the Philippines. Upon the restoration of the Philippine Commonwealth in 1945, Quezon City's divided representation between the two districts of Rizal was retained; this remained so until 1972.

The city was represented in the Interim Batasang Pambansa as part of Region IV from 1978 to 1984. Quezon City residents first elected representatives separate from Rizal in the 1984 election, where four representatives, elected at-large, represented the city at the Regular Batasang Pambansa.

Quezon City was reapportioned into four congressional districts under the new Constitution which was proclaimed on February 11, 1987. It elected members to the restored House of Representatives starting that same year.

By virtue of Republic Act No. 10170 approved on July 2, 2012, the fifth and sixth districts were created out of the second district. Residents of the two new districts began to elect their own representatives beginning in the 2013 elections.

Current districts 
The city was last redistricted on July 2, 2012, where the fifth and sixth districts were apportioned. The city's congressional delegation currently composes of two members of Lakas, two members of the National Unity Party, and two members of the Nacionalista Party. All six representatives are part of the majority bloc in the 19th Congress.
Notes

At-Large (defunct)

See also 
Legislative districts of Rizal
Legislative districts of Manila

References 

Quezon City
Quezon City
Politics of Quezon City